Dröfn Haraldsdóttir (born 8 April 1991) is an Icelandic handball player for FH and the Icelandic national team.

Career
In January 2015, Dröfn signed with Íþróttafélag Reykjavíkur. In January 2017, she signed with Valur. After the season she signed with Stjarnan.

References

1991 births
Living people
Droefn Haraldsdottir
Droefn Haraldsdottir